The National Academy of Technologies of France (Académie des technologies) is a learned society, founded in 2000, with an emphasis on technology, and the newest of French academies. In 2007 it acquired the status of établissement public, which enforces its public role.

Its stated missions are as follows:

 Help to better exploit technologies in service of mankind
 Provide clarity on emerging technologies
 Contribute to public discussion of the risks and benefits of technologies
 Contribute to professional and technological education
 Interest the young and their parents in technologies and new careers
 Raise public interest and comprehension in technologies

In 2021 the academy had approximately 350 active members, including emeritus and foreign members. It is organized into a number of commissions, committees, and work groups on subjects including information technology, ethics, energy and the environment, transport, simulation, defense, etc.

See also 
 French Academy of Sciences

External links 
  National Academy of Technologies of France

 
France
National academies of engineering